Chad Barson (born February 25, 1991) is an American retired professional soccer player. He is currently the Ohio State Buckeyes men's soccer director of operations.

Career statistics
Sources:

References

External links

1991 births
Living people
American soccer players
Akron Zips men's soccer players
Flint City Bucks players
Columbus Crew players
Pittsburgh Riverhounds SC players
Association football defenders
Soccer players from Columbus, Ohio
USL League Two players
Major League Soccer players
USL Championship players
United States men's youth international soccer players
United States men's under-20 international soccer players
All-American men's college soccer players
FC Linköping City players
Expatriate footballers in Sweden
American expatriate sportspeople in Sweden
American expatriate soccer players
Homegrown Players (MLS)